The following is a list of events from the year 2023 in North Korea.

Incumbents

Events

January 

 25 January – NK News reports that the North Korean government has imposed a five-day lockdown in Pyongyang due to the spread of an unspecified respiratory infection.

References 

2023 in North Korea
2020s in North Korea
North Korea
North Korea